Pablito "Pablo" Cruz (born December 30, 1991) is an American soccer player who currently plays for Detroit City FC in the National Independent Soccer Association.

Career 
Cruz signed with the Atlanta Silverbacks in 2012 and made 52 appearances for them over a three-year period until a transfer to the San Antonio Scorpions. After a brief stint in Texas, Cruz signed with FC Edmonton on June 19, 2015. On July 29, 2016, FC Edmonton announced that the club and Cruz had mutually agreed to part ways. In total, Cruz made 19 appearances for the Eddies.

Cruz joined California United FC II in 2017 and was a key contributor to the teams National Championship victories in both the United Premier Soccer League Spring & Fall Seasons.

In October 2018, Cruz and fellow American Eder Arreola left Shirak SC.

On January 9, 2019, Cruz signed for USL Championship side Las Vegas Lights.

On March 1, 2021, Cruz joined National Independent Soccer Association side Detroit City.

International career 
Cruz was selected to be a part of the 07-08 Under 17 US National Team.

In total, he appeared in 7 matches and scored 2 goals, but has not made an international appearance since that 07-08 season.

He also was in the Under 20 squad.

References

External links

1991 births
Living people
American soccer players
Cal FC players
Atlanta Silverbacks players
San Antonio Scorpions players
FC Edmonton players
Orange County SC players
Las Vegas Lights FC players
North American Soccer League players
United States men's youth international soccer players
Association football midfielders
USL Championship players